Salvador Eworo Alene Asama (born 29 November 1998) is an Equatoguinean international footballer who plays for Spanish club CD Los Yébenes San Bruno, as a midfielder.

Career
He has played club football for Cano Sport Academy.

He made his international debut for Equatorial Guinea in 2018.

References

1998 births
Living people
Association football midfielders
Equatoguinean footballers
Equatorial Guinea international footballers
Cano Sport Academy players
Divisiones Regionales de Fútbol players
Tercera División players
CD Cieza players
Equatoguinean expatriate footballers
Equatoguinean expatriate sportspeople in Spain
Expatriate footballers in Spain
Equatorial Guinea A' international footballers
2018 African Nations Championship players